Marmaduke Alexander Lawson  (20 January 1840, Seaton Carew, County Durham – 14 February 1896, Madras) was a British botanist.

Lawson matriculated at Trinity College, Cambridge in 1858 and graduated there B.A. 1862 and M.A. 1868. He was Sherardian Professor of Botany and Rural Economy at Oxford from 1868 to 1883 until he resigned in favour of a post in Madras. From 1883 until his death in 1896, he was Director of the Tamil Nadu Botanical Department at Ootacamund and at Madras (formally, Director of Government Cinchona Plantations, Parks, and Gardens, Nilgiris). His duties included naming and arranging the Madras herbarium and overseeing the production and sale of Cinchona bark from the Government Cinchona plantations in the Nilgiri Hills, Nilgiris District.

Lawson was elected F.L.S. in 1869. He was President of Section of Zoology and Botany of the British Association in 1882.

Eponyms
Pteleopsis myrtifolia (M.A.Lawson) Engl. & Diels

Selected publications

References

External links

Prof Marmaduke Alexander Lawson MA FLS, collector, Botanical Society of Britain & Ireland, herbariaunited.org

1840 births
1896 deaths
Alumni of Trinity College, Cambridge
Botanists with author abbreviations
Sherardian Professors of Botany